The 2019 Okolo Slovenska was a five-stage men's professional road cycling race. The race is the 63rd edition of the Okolo Slovenska. It is rated as a 2.1 event as part of the 2019 UCI Europe Tour. The race started in Bardejov on 18 September and finished on 21 September in Senica.

Teams
The 22 teams invited to the race were:

UCI WorldTeams

 
 
 
 
 

UCI Professional Continental teams

 
 
 
 
 
 
 
 

UCI Continental Teams

 
 
 
 
 
 
 
 

National Teams
 Slovakia

Route

Stages

Stage 1a
18 September 2019 — Bardejov to Bardejov,

Stage 1b
18 September 2019 — Bardejov,  (ITT)

Stage 2
19 September 2019 — Bardejov to Ružomberok,

Stage 3
20 September 2019 — Ružomberok to Hlohovec,

Stage 4
21 September 2019 — Hlohovec to Senica,

Classification leadership table

Classification standings

General classification

Points classification

Mountains classification

Young rider classification

Team classification

Notes and references

References

Notes

External links

2019 UCI Europe Tour
2019 in Slovak sport
Okolo Slovenska